Acorna's Triumph is a 2004 science fantasy novel by American writers Anne McCaffrey and Elizabeth Ann Scarborough. It was the seventh book in the Acorna Universe series, which McCaffrey and Margaret Ball initiated in Acorna: The Unicorn Girl (1997). Triumph completed Acorna's biography, which is sometimes called the Acorna series. It was followed by First Warning, sometimes called the first book of the Acorna's Children trilogy.

Plot synopsis
Acorna's lifemate, Aari, has returned home, and the two may together finish rebuilding their home world. Yet the Aari that has returned from his time travels is different from the one who left, to the point that he almost doesn't remember Acorna or the love that the two shared together. During the confusion while Acorna shifts her attention to stopping a violent criminal from harming innocents, the wicked Khleevi return to retake the planet and destroy the Linyaari and conquer their world. It takes all of Acorna's will to rescue the Aari she loves and put a stop to the Khleevi menace.

References

Notes

Sources
McCaffrey, Anne and Scarborough, Elizabeth Ann. Acorna's Triumph. Harpertorch, 2004. Print.
"Acorna's Triumph." Fantastic Fiction. 2010. Web. 6 March 2010. <http://www.fantasticfiction.co.uk/m/anne-mccaffrey/acornas-triumph.htm>
"Acorna's Triumph." The Worlds of Anne McCaffrey. n.d. Web. 6 March 2010. <https://web.archive.org/web/20090322184132/http://annemccaffrey.net/index.php?page_id=31&bid=89>

2004 American novels
2004 fantasy novels
2004 science fiction novels
Novels by Anne McCaffrey
Novels by Elizabeth Ann Scarborough
Acorna